The sixth season of the American legal drama Suits was ordered on July 1, 2015, and began airing on USA Network in the United States July 13, 2016. The season is produced by Hypnotic Films & Television and Universal Cable Productions, and the executive producers are Doug Liman, David Bartis, and series creator Aaron Korsh. The season has six series regulars playing employees at the fictional Pearson Specter Litt law firm in Manhattan: Gabriel Macht, Patrick J. Adams, Rick Hoffman, Meghan Markle, Sarah Rafferty, and Gina Torres. 

Gina Torres left the show following the summer season due to her contract being up, and she starred in ABC's The Catch. She returned for the season finale and was still credited as main cast for the episode. She further went on to star in the Suits spinoff, Pearson.

Cast

Regular cast
 Gabriel Macht as Harvey Specter
 Patrick J. Adams as Mike Ross
 Rick Hoffman as Louis Litt
 Meghan Markle as Rachel Zane
 Sarah Rafferty as Donna Paulsen
 Gina Torres as Jessica Pearson

Recurring cast
 Aloma Wright as Gretchen Bodinski
 Amanda Schull as Katrina Bennett
 Wendell Pierce as Robert Zane
 David Reale as Benjamin
 Leslie Hope as Anita Gibbs
 Paul Schulze as Frank Gallo
 Erik Palladino as Kevin Miller
 Malcolm-Jamal Warner as Julius Rowe
 Glenn Plummer as Leonard Bailey
 Ian Reed Kesler as Stu Buzzini
 Carly Pope as Tara Messer
 Neal McDonough as Sean Cahill
 Alan Rosenberg as William Sutter
 Peter Cambor as Nathan
 Jordan Johnson-Hinds as Oliver

Episodes

Ratings

References

External links 
Suits season 6 episodes at USA Network
List of Suits season 6 episodes at Internet Movie Database

06
2016 American television seasons
2017 American television seasons